In probability theory and statistics, the Poisson distribution is a discrete probability distribution that expresses the probability of a given number of events occurring in a fixed interval of time or space if these events occur with a known constant mean rate and independently of the time since the last event. It is named after French mathematician Siméon Denis Poisson. The Poisson distribution can also be used for the number of events in other specified interval types such as distance, area, or volume.

For instance, a call center receives an average of 180 calls per hour, 24 hours a day.  The calls are independent; receiving one does not change the probability of when the next one will arrive. The number of calls received during any minute has a Poisson probability distribution with mean 3: the most likely numbers are 2 and 3 but 1 and 4 are also likely and there is a small probability of it being as low as zero and a very small probability it could be 10.

Another example is the number of decay events that occur from a radioactive source during a defined observation period.

History 
The distribution was first introduced by Siméon Denis Poisson (1781–1840) and published together with his probability theory in his work Recherches sur la probabilité des jugements en matière criminelle et en matière civile (1837). The work theorized about the number of wrongful convictions in a given country by focusing on certain random variables  that count, among other things, the number of discrete occurrences (sometimes called "events" or "arrivals") that take place during a time-interval of given length. The result had already been given in 1711 by Abraham de Moivre in De Mensura Sortis seu; de Probabilitate Eventuum in Ludis a Casu Fortuito Pendentibus . This makes it an example of Stigler's law and it has prompted some authors to argue that the Poisson distribution should bear the name of de Moivre.

In 1860, Simon Newcomb fitted the Poisson distribution to the number of stars found in a unit of space.
A further practical application of this distribution was made by Ladislaus Bortkiewicz in 1898 when he was given the task of investigating the number of soldiers in the Prussian army killed accidentally by horse kicks; this experiment introduced the Poisson distribution to the field of reliability engineering.

Definitions

Probability mass function

A discrete random variable  is said to have a Poisson distribution, with parameter  if it has a probability mass function given by:

where
  is the number of occurrences
  is Euler's number
  is the factorial function.

The Poisson distribution can be applied to systems with a large number of possible events, each of which is rare. The number of such events that occur during a fixed time interval is, under the right circumstances, a random number with a Poisson distribution.

The equation can be adapted if, instead of the average number of events  we are given the average rate  at which events occur. Then  and:

Example

The Poisson distribution may be useful to model events such as:
 the number of meteorites greater than 1 meter diameter that strike Earth in a year;
 the number of laser photons hitting a detector in a particular time interval; and
 the number of students achieving a low and high mark in an exam.

Assumptions and validity
The Poisson distribution is an appropriate model if the following assumptions are true:
  is the number of times an event occurs in an interval and  can take values 0, 1, 2, ... .
 The occurrence of one event does not affect the probability that a second event will occur. That is, events occur independently.
 The average rate at which events occur is independent of any occurrences. For simplicity, this is usually assumed to be constant, but may in practice vary with time.
 Two events cannot occur at exactly the same instant; instead, at each very small sub-interval, either exactly one event occurs, or no event occurs.

The Poisson distribution is also the limit of a binomial distribution, for which the probability of success for each trial equals  divided by the number of trials, as the number of trials approaches infinity (see Related distributions).

Examples of probability for Poisson distributions 

On a particular river, overflow floods occur once every 100 years on average. Calculate the probability of  = 0, 1, 2, 3, 4, 5, or 6 overflow floods in a 100 year interval, assuming the Poisson model is appropriate.

Because the average event rate is one overflow flood per 100 years,  = 1

 
 
 
 

{| class="wikitable"
|-
!  !! ( overflow floods in 100 years)
|-
| 0|| 0.368
|-
| 1|| 0.368
|-
| 2|| 0.184
|-
| 3|| 0.061
|-
| 4|| 0.015
|-
| 5|| 0.003
|-
| 6|| 0.0005
|}
The probability for 0 to 6 overflow floods in a 100 year period.

María Dolores Ugarte and colleagues report that the average number of goals in a World Cup soccer match is approximately 2.5 and the Poisson model is appropriate.
Because the average event rate is 2.5 goals per match,  = 2.5 .

 
 
 
 

{| class="wikitable"
|-
!  !! ( goals in a World Cup soccer match)
|-
| 0|| 0.082
|-
| 1|| 0.205
|-
| 2|| 0.257
|-
| 3|| 0.213
|-
| 4|| 0.133
|-
| 5|| 0.067
|-
| 6|| 0.028
|-
| 7|| 0.010
|}
The probability for 0 to 7 goals in a match.

Once in an interval events: The special case of  = 1 and  = 0 

Suppose that astronomers estimate that large meteorites (above a certain size) hit the earth on average once every 100 years ( event per 100 years), and that the number of meteorite hits follows a Poisson distribution. What is the probability of  meteorite hits in the next 100 years?

 

Under these assumptions, the probability that no large meteorites hit the earth in the next 100 years is roughly 0.37. The remaining  is the probability of 1, 2, 3, or more large meteorite hits in the next 100 years.
In an example above, an overflow flood occurred once every 100 years  The probability of no overflow floods in 100 years was roughly 0.37, by the same calculation.

In general, if an event occurs on average once per interval ( = 1), and the events follow a Poisson distribution, then  In addition,  as shown in the table for overflow floods.

Examples that violate the Poisson assumptions 

The number of students who arrive at the student union per minute will likely not follow a Poisson distribution, because the rate is not constant (low rate during class time, high rate between class times) and the arrivals of individual students are not independent (students tend to come in groups). The non-constant arrival rate may be modeled as a mixed Poisson distribution, and the arrival of groups rather than individual students as a compound Poisson process.

The number of magnitude 5 earthquakes per year in a country may not follow a Poisson distribution, if one large earthquake increases the probability of aftershocks of similar magnitude.

Examples in which at least one event is guaranteed are not Poisson distributed; but may be modeled using a zero-truncated Poisson distribution.

Count distributions in which the number of intervals with zero events is higher than predicted by a Poisson model may be modeled using a zero-inflated model.

Properties

Descriptive statistics 
 The coefficient of variation is  while the index of dispersion is 1.
 The mean absolute deviation about the mean is 
This is also written as floor().
 All of the cumulants of the Poisson distribution are equal to the expected value . The  th factorial moment of the Poisson distribution is  .
 The expected value of a Poisson process is sometimes decomposed into the product of intensity and exposure (or more generally expressed as the integral of an "intensity function" over time or space, sometimes described as "exposure").

Median 

Bounds for the median of the distribution are known and are sharp:

Higher moments 
The higher non-centered moments,  of the Poisson distribution, are Touchard polynomials in :  where the {braces} denote Stirling numbers of the second kind. The coefficients of the polynomials have a combinatorial meaning. In fact, when the expected value of the Poisson distribution is 1, then Dobinski's formula says that the ‑th moment equals the number of partitions of a set of size .

A simple bound is

Sums of Poisson-distributed random variables 

Other properties 
 The Poisson distributions are infinitely divisible probability distributions.
 If  is an integer, then  satisfies  and 
 Bounds for the tail probabilities of a Poisson random variable  can be derived using a Chernoff bound argument.  
 The upper tail probability can be tightened (by a factor of at least two) as follows:  where  is the directed Kullback–Leibler divergence, as described above.
 Inequalities that relate the distribution function of a Poisson random variable  to the Standard normal distribution function  are as follows:  where  is again the directed Kullback–Leibler divergence.

Poisson races 

Let  and  be independent random variables, with  then we have that

The upper bound is proved using a standard Chernoff bound.

The lower bound can be proved by noting that  is the probability that  where  which is bounded below by  where  is relative entropy (See the entry on bounds on tails of binomial distributions for details). Further noting that  and computing a lower bound on the unconditional probability gives the result. More details can be found in the appendix of Kamath et al..

Related distributions

As a Binomial distribution with infinitesimal time-steps 
The Poisson distribution can be derived as a limiting case to the binomial distribution as the number of trials goes to infinity and the expected number of successes remains fixed — see law of rare events below. Therefore, it can be used as an approximation of the binomial distribution if  is sufficiently large and p is sufficiently small. The Poisson distribution is a good approximation of the binomial distribution if  is at least 20 and p is smaller than or equal to 0.05, and an excellent approximation if  ≥ 100 and  ≤ 10.

General
Specifically, if  then   More generally, if X1, X2, ..., X are independent Poisson random variables with parameters 1, 2, ...,  then
 given  it follows that  In fact, 
 If  and the distribution of  conditional on X =  is a binomial distribution,  then the distribution of Y follows a Poisson distribution  In fact, if, conditional on   follows a multinomial distribution,  then each  follows an independent Poisson distribution 
 The Poisson distribution is a special case of the discrete compound Poisson distribution (or stuttering Poisson distribution) with only a parameter. The discrete compound Poisson distribution can be deduced from the limiting distribution of univariate multinomial distribution. It is also a special case of a compound Poisson distribution.
 Variance-stabilizing transformation: If  then  and  Under this transformation, the convergence to normality (as  increases) is far faster than the untransformed variable. Other, slightly more complicated, variance stabilizing transformations are available, one of which is Anscombe transform. See Data transformation (statistics) for more general uses of transformations.
 If for every t > 0 the number of arrivals in the time interval  follows the Poisson distribution with mean λt, then the sequence of inter-arrival times are independent and identically distributed exponential random variables having mean 1/.
 The cumulative distribution functions of the Poisson and chi-squared distributions are related in the following ways:  and

Poisson approximation 

Assume  where  then  is multinomially distributed
 conditioned on 

This means, among other things, that for any nonnegative function 
if  is multinomially distributed, then

where 

The factor of  can be replaced by 2 if  is further assumed to be monotonically increasing or decreasing.

Bivariate Poisson distribution 
This distribution has been extended to the bivariate case. The generating function for this distribution is

with 

The marginal distributions are Poisson(θ1) and Poisson(θ2) and the correlation coefficient is limited to the range

A simple way to generate a bivariate Poisson distribution  is to take three independent Poisson distributions  with means  and then set  The probability function of the bivariate Poisson distribution is

Free Poisson distribution
The free Poisson distribution with jump size  and rate  arises in free probability theory as the limit of repeated free convolution

In other words, let  be random variables so that  has value  with probability  and value 0 with the remaining probability. Assume also that the family  are freely independent.

This definition is analogous to one of the ways in which the classical Poisson distribution is obtained from a (classical) Poisson process.

The measure associated to the free Poisson law is given by

where  and has support 

This law also arises in random matrix theory as the Marchenko–Pastur law. Its free cumulants are equal to

Some transforms of this law
We give values of some important transforms of the free Poisson law; the computation can be found in e.g. in the book Lectures on the Combinatorics of Free Probability by A. Nica and R. Speicher

The R-transform of the free Poisson law is given by

The Cauchy transform (which is the negative of the Stieltjes transformation) is given by

The S-transform is given by

in the case that

Weibull and Stable count

Poisson's probability mass function  can be expressed in a form similar to the product distribution of a Weibull distribution and a variant form of the stable count distribution. 
The variable  can be regarded as inverse of Lévy's stability parameter in the stable count distribution:

Statistical inference

Parameter estimation 
Given a sample of  measured values  for  we wish to estimate the value of the parameter  of the Poisson population from which the sample was drawn. The maximum likelihood estimate is 

Since each observation has expectation  so does the sample mean. It is also an efficient estimator since its variance achieves the Cramér–Rao lower bound (CRLB). Hence it is minimum-variance unbiased.

To prove sufficiency we may use the factorization theorem. Consider partitioning the probability mass function of the joint Poisson distribution for the sample into two parts: one that depends solely on the sample  (called ) and one that depends on the parameter  and the sample  only through the function  Then  is a sufficient statistic for 

 

The first term,  depends only on  The second term,  depends on the sample only through  Thus,  is sufficient.

To find the parameter  that maximizes the probability function for the Poisson population, we can use the logarithm of the likelihood function:

 

 

Solving for  gives a stationary point.

 

So  is the average of the i values. Obtaining the sign of the second derivative of L at the stationary point will determine what kind of extreme value  is.

 

Evaluating the second derivative at the stationary point gives:

 

which is the negative of  times the reciprocal of the average of the ki. This expression is negative when the average is positive. If this is satisfied, then the stationary point maximizes the probability function.

For completeness, a family of distributions is said to be complete if and only if  implies that  for all  If the individual  are iid  then  Knowing the distribution we want to investigate, it is easy to see that the statistic is complete.

For this equality to hold,  must be 0. This follows from the fact that none of the other terms will be 0 for all  in the sum and for all possible values of  Hence,  for all  implies that  and the statistic has been shown to be complete.

Confidence interval 
The confidence interval for the mean of a Poisson distribution can be expressed using the relationship between the cumulative distribution functions of the Poisson and chi-squared distributions. The chi-squared distribution is itself closely related to the gamma distribution, and this leads to an alternative expression. Given an observation  from a Poisson distribution with mean μ, a confidence interval for μ with confidence level  is

or equivalently,

This interval is 'exact' in the sense that its coverage probability is never less than the nominal .

When quantiles of the gamma distribution are not available, an accurate approximation to this exact interval has been proposed (based on the Wilson–Hilferty transformation):

where  denotes the standard normal deviate with upper tail area .

For application of these formulae in the same context as above (given a sample of  measured values i each drawn from a Poisson distribution with mean ), one would set

Bayesian inference 
In Bayesian inference, the conjugate prior for the rate parameter  of the Poisson distribution is the gamma distribution. Let

denote that  is distributed according to the gamma density g parameterized in terms of a shape parameter α and an inverse scale parameter β:

Then, given the same sample of  measured values i as before, and a prior of Gamma(α, β), the posterior distribution is

Note that the posterior mean is linear and is given by 

It can be shown that gamma distribution is the only prior that induces linearity of the conditional mean. Moreover, a converse result exists which states that if the conditional mean is close to a linear function in the  distance than the prior distribution of  must be close to gamma distribution in Levy distance.

The posterior predictive distribution for a single additional observation is a negative binomial distribution, sometimes called a gamma–Poisson distribution.

Simultaneous estimation of multiple Poisson means 
Suppose  is a set of independent random variables from a set of  Poisson distributions, each with a parameter   and we would like to estimate these parameters. Then, Clevenson and Zidek show that under the normalized squared error loss  when  then, similar as in Stein's example for the Normal means, the MLE estimator  is inadmissible. 

Occurrence and applications 

Applications of the Poisson distribution can be found in many fields including:
 Count data in general
 Telecommunication example: telephone calls arriving in a system.
 Astronomy example: photons arriving at a telescope.
 Chemistry example: the molar mass distribution of a living polymerization.
 Biology example: the number of mutations on a strand of DNA per unit length.
 Management example: customers arriving at a counter or call centre.
 Finance and insurance example: number of losses or claims occurring in a given period of time.
 Earthquake seismology example: an asymptotic Poisson model of seismic risk for large earthquakes.
 Radioactivity example: number of decays in a given time interval in a radioactive sample.
 Optics example: the number of photons emitted in a single laser pulse. This is a major vulnerability to most Quantum key distribution protocols known as Photon Number Splitting (PNS).

The Poisson distribution arises in connection with Poisson processes. It applies to various phenomena of discrete properties (that is, those that may happen 0, 1, 2, 3, … times during a given period of time or in a given area) whenever the probability of the phenomenon happening is constant in time or space. Examples of events that may be modelled as a Poisson distribution include:

 The number of soldiers killed by horse-kicks each year in each corps in the Prussian cavalry. This example was used in a book by Ladislaus Bortkiewicz (1868–1931).
 The number of yeast cells used when brewing Guinness beer. This example was used by William Sealy Gosset (1876–1937).
 The number of phone calls arriving at a call centre within a minute. This example was described by A.K. Erlang (1878–1929).
 Internet traffic.
 The number of goals in sports involving two competing teams.
 The number of deaths per year in a given age group.
 The number of jumps in a stock price in a given time interval.
 Under an assumption of homogeneity, the number of times a web server is accessed per minute.
 The number of mutations in a given stretch of DNA after a certain amount of radiation.
 The proportion of cells that will be infected at a given multiplicity of infection.
 The number of bacteria in a certain amount of liquid.
 The arrival of photons on a pixel circuit at a given illumination and over a given time period.
 The targeting of V-1 flying bombs on London during World War II investigated by R. D. Clarke in 1946.
Gallagher showed in 1976 that the counts of prime numbers in short intervals obey a Poisson distribution provided a certain version of the unproved prime r-tuple conjecture of Hardy-Littlewood is true.

Law of rare events 

The rate of an event is related to the probability of an event occurring in some small subinterval (of time, space or otherwise). In the case of the Poisson distribution, one assumes that there exists a small enough subinterval for which the probability of an event occurring twice is "negligible". With this assumption one can derive the Poisson distribution from the Binomial one, given only the information of expected number of total events in the whole interval.

Let the total number of events in the whole interval be denoted by  Divide the whole interval into  subintervals  of equal size, such that  (since we are interested in only very small portions of the interval this assumption is meaningful). This means that the expected number of events in each of the  subintervals is equal to 

Now we assume that the occurrence of an event in the whole interval can be seen as a sequence of  Bernoulli trials, where the -th Bernoulli trial corresponds to looking whether an event happens at the subinterval  with probability  The expected number of total events in  such trials would be  the expected number of total events in the whole interval. Hence for each subdivision of the interval we have approximated the occurrence of the event as a Bernoulli process of the form  As we have noted before we want to consider only very small subintervals. Therefore, we take the limit as  goes to infinity.

In this case the binomial distribution converges to what is known as the Poisson distribution by the Poisson limit theorem.

In several of the above examples — such as, the number of mutations in a given sequence of DNA—the events being counted are actually the outcomes of discrete trials, and would more precisely be modelled using the binomial distribution, that is

Then the distribution may be approximated by the less cumbersome Poisson distribution 

This approximation is sometimes known as the law of rare events, since each of the  individual Bernoulli events rarely occurs.

The name "law of rare events" may be misleading because the total count of success events in a Poisson process need not be rare if the parameter  is not small. For example, the number of telephone calls to a busy switchboard in one hour follows a Poisson distribution with the events appearing frequent to the operator, but they are rare from the point of view of the average member of the population who is very unlikely to make a call to that switchboard in that hour.

The variance of the binomial distribution is 1 − p times that of the Poisson distribution, so almost equal when p is very small.

The word law is sometimes used as a synonym of probability distribution, and convergence in law means convergence in distribution. Accordingly, the Poisson distribution is sometimes called the "law of small numbers" because it is the probability distribution of the number of occurrences of an event that happens rarely but has very many opportunities to happen. The Law of Small Numbers is a book by Ladislaus Bortkiewicz about the Poisson distribution, published in 1898.

Poisson point process 

The Poisson distribution arises as the number of points of a Poisson point process located in some finite region. More specifically, if D is some region space, for example Euclidean space Rd, for which |D|, the area, volume or, more generally, the Lebesgue measure of the region is finite, and if  denotes the number of points in D, then

Poisson regression and negative binomial regression 

Poisson regression and negative binomial regression are useful for analyses where the dependent (response) variable is the count  of the number of events or occurrences in an interval.

Other applications in science 

In a Poisson process, the number of observed occurrences fluctuates about its mean  with a standard deviation  These fluctuations are denoted as Poisson noise or (particularly in electronics) as shot noise.

The correlation of the mean and standard deviation in counting independent discrete occurrences is useful scientifically. By monitoring how the fluctuations vary with the mean signal, one can estimate the contribution of a single occurrence, even if that contribution is too small to be detected directly. For example, the charge e on an electron can be estimated by correlating the magnitude of an electric current with its shot noise.

An everyday example is the graininess that appears as photographs are enlarged; the graininess is due to Poisson fluctuations in the number of reduced silver grains, not to the individual grains themselves. By correlating the graininess with the degree of enlargement, one can estimate the contribution of an individual grain (which is otherwise too small to be seen unaided). Many other molecular applications of Poisson noise have been developed, e.g., estimating the number density of receptor molecules in a cell membrane.
 

In causal set theory the discrete elements of spacetime follow a Poisson distribution in the volume.

Computational methods

The Poisson distribution poses two different tasks for dedicated software libraries: evaluating the distribution , and drawing random numbers according to that distribution.

Evaluating the Poisson distribution 
For numerical stability the Poisson probability mass function should therefore be evaluated as

which is mathematically equivalent but numerically stable. The natural logarithm of the Gamma function can be obtained using the lgamma function in the C standard library (C99 version) or R, the gammaln function in MATLAB or SciPy, or the log_gamma function in Fortran 2008 and later.

Some computing languages provide built-in functions to evaluate the Poisson distribution, namely
 R: function dpois(x, lambda);
 Excel: function POISSON( x, mean, cumulative), with a flag to specify the cumulative distribution;
 Mathematica: univariate Poisson distribution as PoissonDistribution[], bivariate Poisson distribution as MultivariatePoissonDistribution[{  }],.

Random variate generation 

The less trivial task is to draw integer random variate from the Poisson distribution with given 

Solutions are provided by:
 R: function rpois(n, lambda);
 GNU Scientific Library (GSL): function gsl_ran_poisson

A simple algorithm to generate random Poisson-distributed numbers (pseudo-random number sampling) has been given by Knuth:

 algorithm poisson random number (Knuth):
     init:
         Let L ← e−λ, k ← 0 and p ← 1.
     do:
         k ← k + 1.
         Generate uniform random number u in [0,1] and let p ← p × u.
     while p > L.
     return k − 1.

There are many other algorithms to improve this.

This can be solved by a change to the algorithm which uses an additional parameter STEP such that e−STEP does not underflow: 

 algorithm poisson random number (Junhao, based on Knuth):
     init:
         Let Left ← , k ← 0 and p ← 1.
     do:
         k ← k + 1.
         Generate uniform random number u in (0,1) and let p ← p × u.
         while p < 1 and Left > 0:
             if Left > STEP:
                 p ← p × eSTEP
                 Left ← Left − STEP
             else:
                 p ← p × eLeft
                 Left ← 0
     while p > 1.
     return k − 1.

The choice of STEP depends on the threshold of overflow. For double precision floating point format the threshold is near e700, so 500 should be a safe STEP.

Other solutions for large values of  include rejection sampling and using Gaussian approximation.

Cumulative probabilities are examined in turn until one exceeds u.

 algorithm Poisson generator based upon the inversion by sequential search:
     init:
         Let x ← 0, p ← e−λ, s ← p.
         Generate uniform random number u in [0,1].
     while u > s do:
         x ← x + 1.
         p ← p ×  / x.
         s ← s + p.
     return x.

See also 

 Binomial distribution
 Compound Poisson distribution
 Conway–Maxwell–Poisson distribution
 Erlang distribution
 Hermite distribution
 Index of dispersion
 Negative binomial distribution
 Poisson clumping
 Poisson point process
 Poisson regression
 Poisson sampling
 Poisson wavelet
 Queueing theory
 Renewal theory
 Robbins lemma
 Skellam distribution
 Tweedie distribution
 Zero-inflated model
 Zero-truncated Poisson distribution

References

Citations

Sources 

 
 
 

 
Articles with example pseudocode
Conjugate prior distributions
Factorial and binomial topics
Infinitely divisible probability distributions